Sikter is a Bosnian alternative rock band from Sarajevo. The band was formed in 1990 as a punk rock project of a few students, but became one of the most successful Bosnian rock bands. The name of the band is translated as Buzz Off!

From 1990 they changed line-ups many times, as well as musical styles. Their first songs were parodies of Yugoslavian pop songs. Sikter became the first band from Bosnia and Herzegovina whose video clip Pain In Brain was broadcast on MTV for several months.

They recorded four albums: Now, Always, Never in 2000, Queen of the Disco in 2002, My Music in 2005 and Ego Trip in 2009. The album Now, Always, Never was produced by English musician Brian Eno.

History
Band Sikter was formed in spring 1990. in Sarajevo. It was created spontaneously at fresh party on Sarajevo Academy of Fine Arts. At the party was supposed to play pop rock band Regina but when they started to play, Enes Zlatar, Igor Čamo, Faris Arapović, and Davor Čolić came to the stage and repelled Regina from stage with word Sikter which means Buzz Off and started to play. After that party band was formed and they played a parody of Yugoslavian pop songs with punk rock elements. First two years, the band didn't constant line-up and rehearsals so many musicians played in the band in a period of 1990-1992.

By the beginning of the war in Bosnia and Herzegovina, the band started the transformation from punk rock to alternative rock band but still with elements of punk. During the siege, Sarajevo had a large alternative scene and numerous club concerts. Sikter was one of the most active bands during that period. They performed on the Rock Under Siege concert in Sloga club organized by Radio ZID. In 1994, they performed as the opening act at Bruce Dickinson concert in Sarajevo. Also MTV made a reportage from their concert in Obala Arts Center in Sarajevo.

In 1995 Haris Pašović invites band members to join his theatre ensemble. During that time the team of journalists from BBC came to Sarajevo and started to hang out with the band members. They decided to record their first music video for the song Pain in Brain directed by Haris Pašović. It was aired often on MTV UK during 1995. In April 1995 they came to London with the ensemble to perform on play Silk Drums on festival Memories 45-95 but under certain circumstances, ensemble didn't perform. Because Airport in Sarajevo was closed, ensemble can not be returned in Bosnia and Herzegovina so they must stay in London for a couple of weeks and after that, they went to Amsterdam and the band started to rehearse and play again. They have a lot of concerts in the Netherlands during 1995 and they met Brian Eno in one of the Amsterdam clubs. Dutch saxophonist Jan Kooper also joined the band. In July 1995, Vasco Rossi invites the band to play on his double concert Rock sotto l'assedio which held on San Siro stadium in Milano.

After the end of the war, the band returns to Bosnia and Herzegovina. In 1996 Vasco Rossi again invites them to join him on his tour across Italy. After Italy, they went on tour in Belgium, France, and the Czech Republic during 1996. By the end of 1996, they started to rehearse and play in Bosnia and planning their debut album.

In 1997 they played on the U2 concert in Sarajevo as an opening act. They are invited to open Pavarotti Music Centre in Mostar and perform with Bono Vox, Jovanotti and Brian Eno. Also, they agreed with Brian Eno to come into Mostar and help them to record their debut album. They started to record in the spring 1998 and ended recording of the album by the end of 1998.

The album Now, Always, Never was released two years after recording on 21 November 2000. Album was long-awaited in Bosnia and Herzegovina and has received a good reviews. It was distributed internationally by The Orchard.

By the end of February 2002 band released a second album Queen of the Disco. Album was not well accepted because of the changing of musical style from alternative rock to disco music.

During the 2004 they signed a contract with label Gramofon from Sarajevo which published their third album My Music and single "Don't You Miss Me". The album was supported with DVD My Documents which was released 2006. On the DVD was also released a film about the band I Was Dreaming About Smirnoff Buffalo directed by Timur Makarević.

In 2009 band released their last album Ego Trip. The album was released by one of the biggest labels in Bosnia and Herzegovina Hayat Production.

At the start of the 2017 band decided to no longer exist and they made a farewell concert on February 2, 2017 at Bosnian national television studio.

Discography

Studio albums
 Now, Always, Never (2000)
 Queen of the Disco (2002)
 My Music (2005)
 Ego Trip (2009)

Singles
 Don't You Miss Me from the album My Music (2005)

Video Albums
 My Documents (2006)

Members

Final line-up
Enes Zlatar - vocals, keyboards (1990–2017)
Esad Bratović - guitar (1994–2017)
Dragan Rokvić - bass, vocals (1996–2017)
Igor Čamo - keyboards (1990, 2000–2017)
Nedim Zlatar - drums (2002–2017)
Leondardo Šarić - backing vocals (2005–2017)
Dejan Kajević - backing vocals (2005–2017)

Former members
Faris Arapović - drums (1990, 1993-2002)
Davor Tadić - bass (1990-1992)
Davor Čolić - guitar (1990-1992)
Darko Jelisić - drums (1990-1992)
Nebojša Šerić - bass, guitar (1990-1995)
Nedžad Sladić - guitar (1990-1992)
Igor Vukašinović (deceased) - guitar (1992-1993)

Sandi Ilić - bass (1993)
Dušan Vranić - keyboards (1994)
Hamdija Kreševljaković - bass (1995) 
Jan Kooper - saxophone (1995, 2006) 
Wilbrandt Meischke - bass (1995) 
Renato Foder - keyboards (2002)
Režinald Šimek - keyboards (2004–2006)

References

External links
Sikter on MySpace
Sikter on Last.fm
Sikter's fanclub
Gramofon.ba

Bosnia and Herzegovina musical groups
Musical groups established in 1990
Hayat Production artists